In projective geometry, the circular points at infinity  (also called cyclic points or isotropic points) are two special points at infinity in the complex projective plane that are contained in the complexification of every real circle.

Coordinates
A point of the complex projective plane may be described in terms of homogeneous coordinates, being a triple of complex numbers , where two triples describe the same point of the plane when the coordinates of one triple are the same as those of the other aside from being multiplied by the same nonzero factor.  In this system, the points at infinity may be chosen as those whose z-coordinate is zero.  The two circular points at infinity are two of these, usually taken to be those with homogeneous coordinates

Trilinear coordinates 
Let A. B. C be the measures of the vertex angles of the reference triangle ABC. Then the trilinear coordinates of the circular points at infinity in the plane of the reference triangle are as given below:

or,  equivalently,

or, again equivalently,

where .

Complexified circles
A real circle, defined by its center point (x0,y0) and radius r (all three of which are real numbers) may be described as the set of real solutions to the equation

Converting this into a homogeneous equation and taking the set of all complex-number solutions gives the complexification of the circle. The two circular points have their name because they lie on the complexification of every real circle. More generally, both points satisfy the homogeneous equations of the type 
 
The case where the coefficients are all real gives the equation of a general  circle (of the real projective plane). In general, an algebraic curve that passes through these two points is called circular.

Additional properties
The circular points at infinity are the points at infinity of the isotropic lines.
They are invariant under translations and rotations of the plane.

The concept of angle can be defined using the circular points, natural logarithm and cross-ratio:
The angle between two lines is a certain multiple of the logarithm of the cross-ratio of the pencil formed by the two lines and the lines joining their intersection to the circular points.
Sommerville configures two lines on the origin as  Denoting the circular points as ω and ω′, he obtains the cross ratio
 so that

References

 Pierre Samuel (1988) Projective Geometry, Springer, section 1.6;
 Semple and Kneebone (1952) Algebraic projective geometry'', Oxford, section II-8.

Projective geometry
Complex manifolds
Infinity